Abram Belskie (March 24, 1907 – November 7, 1988) was a British-born sculptor. He is known for his 1939 collaboration with Dr. Robertson Dickinson on the Birth Series Sculptures.

Biography
Belskie was born in London and grew up in Glasgow, Scotland. He graduated from the Glasgow School of Art in 1926. In 1929 he emigrated to New York, USA, to work for British sculptor John Gregory.

In 1938 Belskie was introduced to physician Robert Latou Dickinson and subsequently applied his skills to create medical models, some of which were exhibited at the World's Fair of 1939. This was known as the Dickinson-Belskie Birth Series. In 1942, he created two sculptures, Norma and Normman, based on data collected by Dickinson, intended to represent the statistical ideal female and male figure.  After Dickinson's death in 1950, Belskie instead created medallions (occasionally medicine-related).

Belskie died in 1988 and, in 1993, the Belskie Museum of Arts and Science was opened in Closter, New Jersey. It was founded by the Closter Lions Club to preserve, house and exhibit the works of Abram Belskie. It was entirely funded by membership fees, donations, grants and local subsidies.

Memberships 
National Sculpture Society, fellow
National Academy of Design, fellow
The American Numismatic Society, fellow
Allied Artists of America.

Awards 
John Keppie Traveling Scholarship, Scotland, 1926;
Sir John Edward Burnett Prize, Scotland, 1928;
Lindsay Morris Memorial Award, 1951;
J. Sanford Saltus Medal, American Numismatic Society, 1959:
Mrs. Louis Bennett Award, 1956; Golden Anniversary Prize, Allied Artists of America, 1963

Collections 
In addition to private collections, Belskie's work is exhibited at:
American Museum of Natural History, New York 
The Field Museum, Chicago, Illinois
Mariner's Museum, Newport News, Virginia
Brookgreen Gardens, Pawley Island, South Carolina
Cleveland Health Museum, Cleveland, OH;
Johnson & Johnson, New Brunswick, New Jersey.
Jewish Theological Seminary, New York
Park Avenue Synagogue, New York
New York Academy of Medicine, New York 
The Belskie Museum, Closter, New Jersey

References 

1907 births
1988 deaths
British emigrants to the United States
20th-century British painters
British male painters
20th-century American sculptors
American male sculptors
Forensic artists
New York Medical College faculty
People from Closter, New Jersey
20th-century British sculptors
British male sculptors
Sculptors from New Jersey
Alumni of the Glasgow School of Art
Artists from London
20th-century American male artists
20th-century British male artists